Ramiro Canovas (born August 6, 1981) is an Argentine professional footballer who plays as a center back for the Atlanta Silverbacks in the North American Soccer League.

Career

Early career
Born in Buenos Aires, Argentina, Canovas started his career in the United States with the Mercer University Bears before joining the Melchester Wings in the Atlanta District Amateur Soccer League. He then joined the Atlanta Silverbacks Reserves, then known as Atlanta FC, of the National Premier Soccer League. Canovas scored the club's first ever goal in the Lamar Hunt U.S. Open Cup in 2008. He then went on to captain the Silverbacks Reserves from 2010 to 2012.

Atlanta Silverbacks
On March 2, 2014 it was announced that Canovas had signed his first professional contract at age 32 with the Atlanta Silverbacks of the North American Soccer League. He then made his professional debut with the side on May 17, 2014 against the Carolina RailHawks. He came on as a 6th-minute substitute for Edgar Espinoza as the Silverbacks lost 2–0.

Career statistics

References

External links 
 Atlanta Silverbacks Profile.

1981 births
Living people
Footballers from Buenos Aires
Argentine footballers
Atlanta Silverbacks players
Association football defenders
North American Soccer League players
Expatriate soccer players in the United States
Mercer University alumni